San Pedro Mártir (a reference to the martyrdom of St. Peter) may refer to:
Sierra San Pedro Mártir, a mountain range on Mexico's Baja California Peninsula, part of which is:
Parque Nacional Sierra de San Pedro Mártir, a national park 
San Pedro Mártir, Oaxaca, a town in the Mexican state of Oaxaca
San Pedro Mártir Quiechapa, a town in the Mexican state of Oaxaca
San Pedro Mártir Yucuxaco, a town in the Mexican state of Oaxaca
San Pedro Mártir Island, Gulf of California, Mexico